The Roman Heritage Way is a long-distance path in England and Scotland. It covers parts of Cumbria, Northumberland, the Scottish Borders, and Tyneside.

The Way was developed from sections of the Hadrian's Wall Path, the Pennine Way, Dere Street, the St. Cuthbert's Way, and a set of Core Paths around Newtown St Boswells and Melrose.

Three main options present themselves to the walker:
Segedunum to Trimontium (Wallsend to Melrose)
Maia Fort to Trimontium (Bowness-on-Solway to Melrose)
Segedunum to Maia Fort (Newcastle to Bowness-on-Solway): Complete length of Hadrian's wall, with a range of Roman forts, museums and exhibitions.

See also

Borders Abbeys Way
Central Scottish Way
James Hutton Trail
Pennine Way National Trail
St. Cuthbert's Way
Sir Walter Scott Way
Southern Upland Way

References

External links
Roman Heritage Way 

Long-distance footpaths in England
Long-distance footpaths in Scotland
Long-distance footpaths in the United Kingdom
Footpaths in Cumbria
Footpaths in Northumberland